Preljubje is a village northeast of Lake Prespa in the Resen Municipality of North Macedonia. The village is named after Preljub.

Demographics 
Preljublje's has been declining for decades and is at only 16 as of the most recent census in 2002.

References 

Villages in Resen Municipality